West Edmonton may refer to:

Edmonton West (federal electoral district), from 1917 to 1988 and from 1997 to 2004
Edmonton West (provincial electoral district), from 1917 to 1921 and from 1963 to 1971
West sector, Edmonton, a region encompassing numerous neighbourhoods
West Edmonton, Alberta, incorporated as a village in 1910, annexed by Edmonton in 1917
West Edmonton Mall, a shopping mall in Summerlea, Edmonton